Guy's Big Bite is a Food Network show starring Guy Fieri, winner of the second season of The Next Food Network Star. The inaugural six-episode season premiered on June 25, 2006 in the 10:00 a.m. (EST) timeslot. The initial concept included Fieri cooking in a bachelor pad-like set featuring a large television and car memorabilia. Executives reportedly loved the show, including Fieri's magnetic personality.

Food Network renewed the series after the successful inaugural trial run.  Beginning in season Two, Fieri received a more personalized set including a "guy" fridge with a #05 and racing stripes, a pin ball machine, big screen television, in-house bar, and a bumper-pool table.  He then regularly had his friends and "posse" join him during episodes. 

In season 10, Fieri shifted the focus from a studio kitchen to his own backyard, having guests at his own home besides his own techniques in the backyard of his home.

Guy's Big Bite aired for nineteen seasons, completing in 2016.

References

External links 
Guy's Big Bite on FoodNetwork.com
 

Food Network original programming
2000s American cooking television series
2006 American television series debuts
2010s American cooking television series
English-language television shows